Marinicauda algicola is a Gram-negative bacterium from the genus of Marinicauda which has been isolated from the alga Rhodosorus marinus from Korea.

References 

Caulobacterales
Bacteria described in 2017